Georgi Sheytanov (born 24 November 1972) is a former Bulgarian footballer who played as a goalkeeper.

Personal life
Sheytanov is the father of the footballer Dimitar Sheytanov.

References

External links
 Profile at nowgoal.com
 Profile at LevskiSofia.info

1972 births
Living people
Bulgarian footballers
First Professional Football League (Bulgaria) players
PFC Levski Sofia players
PFC Slavia Sofia players
PFC Spartak Pleven players
FC Montana players
PFC Minyor Pernik players
Panserraikos F.C. players
PAS Giannina F.C. players
Bulgarian expatriate footballers
Expatriate footballers in Greece
Association football goalkeepers